San Dimas (Spanish for "Saint Dismas")
is a city in the San Gabriel Valley of Los Angeles County, California, United States.  At the 2020 census, its population was 34,924. It historically took its name from San Dimas Canyon in the San Gabriel Mountains above the northern section of present-day San Dimas.

San Dimas is bordered by the San Gabriel Mountains range to the north, Glendora and Covina to the west, La Verne to its north and east side, Pomona to its south and east side, Walnut and the unincorporated community of Ramona to the southwest, and the unincorporated community of West San Dimas, which is an enclave in the southwestern portion of the city.

History

The first known European exploration of the area was in 1774, when Juan Bautista de Anza passed through on the first overland expedition of Las Californias, from New Spain-Mexico towards Monterey Bay.  The area was originally developed in 1837 with the Mexican land grant from Governor Juan Bautista Alvarado to Ygnacio Palomares and Ricardo Vejar for the Rancho San Jose, then in Alta California. It later became known as La Cienega Mud Springs, so named because of local mud springs that created a riparian marsh and healing place.  Palomares and Vejar conducted sheep and cattle operations on Rancho San Jose, also growing crops for consumption by the residents of the rancho.  In the early 1860s, a severe drought decimated the ranch's population of sheep and cattle.  Ygnacio Palomares died in 1864, and his widow began selling the ranch land in 1865.  Vejar lost his share by foreclosure to two Los Angeles merchants, Isaac Schlesinger and Hyman Tischler, in 1864.  In 1866, Schlesinger and Tischler sold the ranch to Louis Phillips.

The arrival of the Los Angeles and San Gabriel Valley Railroad in 1887, later purchased by Santa Fe Railroad,  led to La Cienega Mud Springs being first mapped. The ensuing land boom resulted in the formation of the San Jose Ranch Company, which first laid out streets.  Small businesses began to open soon thereafter, and the city took on a new name: San Dimas. Growth was rapid, and San Dimas soon became an agricultural community. Wheat and other Midwestern United States crops were planted first; then orange and lemon groves covered the town and the San Gabriel Valley. At one time, four citrus packing houses and a marmalade factory were located in San Dimas. The Sunkist name originated here, first spelled "Sunkissed". Oranges were the major crop and business in San Dimas until the mid-20th century.

San Dimas incorporated as a city in 1960, and is now known for its Western art, small-town feel, and equestrian qualities. In the 1990s, San Dimas was also host to the Miss Rodeo California State Pageant, run by A. F. "Shorty" Feldbush and various other city volunteers. The week-long pageant was held in conjunction with the city's Western Days and Rodeo, until the pageant moved to its new home in central California.

In 1971, the San Dimas Golf Course was purchased. In 1972, San Dimas Community Hospital opened its 92-bed facility.  In 1981, the San Dimas Swim and Racquet Club was built next to San Dimas High School, according to the San Dimas Historical Society.

Geography
Cinnamon Creek crosses the city, roughly parallel to the Arrow Highway, before reaching Cinnamon Falls near San Dimas Avenue.

San Dimas runs along and southward from historic U.S. Route 66, another part of its development in the earlier 20th century. Other major arteries include Arrow Highway (east–west) and San Dimas Avenue (north–south). The Foothill Freeway (I-210) connects the city to Pasadena and the San Fernando Valley, with California State Route 57 connecting to Orange County and the beaches.

Climate
This region experiences hot and dry summers, with no average monthly temperatures above . According to the Köppen climate classification, San Dimas has a warm-summer Mediterranean climate, Csb on climate maps.

Demographics

2020 census
The 2020 United States Census reported that the population of San Dimas was 34,924 people with 11,396 households. There were a total of 13,033 housing units. The racial makeup of the city was 49.5% White (40.8% Non-Hispanic White), 3.8% Black or African American, 1.1% Native American, 14.3% Asian, and 0.1% Pacific Islander, with 12.4% from other races, and 18.6% from two or more races. Hispanic or Latino residents, of any race, made up 37.0% of the population.

Of the 11,396 households. 20.4% had children under 18 living with them, 52.6% were married couples living together, and 26.9% had a female householder with no spouse present. About 28.2% of all households were made up of individuals. The average household size was 2.9 persons per household and the average family size per household was 3.36 persons.

In the city, the age distribution was 20.4% under the age of 18, with 4.9% being 5 and under. 79.6% of the population was over the age of 18, while 19.2% were over the age of 65. Of those over the age of 65, 11.7% were between the age of 65 and 74, 5.6% were between the age of 75 and 84, and 1.9% were 85 years of age or older. The median age was 42 years of age. 53.5% of the population is female.

The median income for a household in the city was $90,234. The median income for a family with a married couple present in the household was $124,368 and for families, in general, was $110,969. Nonfamily households held a median income of $40,720. 8.8% of the population were below the poverty line. Of the total population, 6.9% of those under the age of 18 and 11.3% and older were living below the poverty line.

58.1% of those living in San Dimas were employed. The average person living in the city took 33.3 minutes to travel to work. 74.9% of those persons drove alone, 11.2% carpooled, 1.7% used a form of public transportation, 1.7% walked. 8.4% of those living in the city worked from home.

2010 census
The 2010 United States Census reported that San Dimas had a population of 33,371. The racial makeup of San Dimas was 24,038 (72.0%) White with 52.3% being non-Hispanic white, 1,084 (3.2%) African American, 233 (0.7%) Native American, 3,496 (10.5%) Asian, 48 (0.1%) Pacific Islander, 2,828 (8.5%) from other races, and 1,644 (4.9%) from two or more races. Hispanics or Latinos of any race were 10,491 persons (31.4%).

The census reported that 32,831 people (98.4% of the population) lived in households, 320 (1.0%) lived in noninstitutionalized group quarters, and 220 (0.7%) were institutionalized.

Of the 12,030 households, 32.2% had children under the age of 18 living in them, 54.9% were opposite-sex married couples living together, 12.2% had a female householder with no husband present, 5.1% had a male householder with no wife present, 4.5% were unmarried opposite-sex partnerships, and 91 (0.8%) same-sex married couples or partnerships. About 22.2% were made up of individuals, and 10.6% had someone living alone who was 65 years of age or older. The average household size was 2.73.   Families comprised 72.1% of all households; the average family size was 3.19.

The population was distributed as 20.9% under the age of 18, 9.8% aged 18 to 24, 22.6% aged 25 to 44, 31.1% aged 45 to 64, and 15.5% who were 65 years of age or older.  The median age was 42.6 years. For every 100 females, there were 90.5 males.  For every 100 females age 18 and over, there were 86.8 males.

The homeowner vacancy rate was 1.1%; the rental vacancy rate was 5.6%. About 73.4% of the population lived in owner-occupied housing units and 25.0% lived in rental housing units.

According to the 2010 United States Census, San Dimas had a median household income of $78,685, with 6.6% of the population living below the federal poverty line.

2000 census
As of the census of 2000,  34,980 people, 12,163 households, and 8,988 families were residing in the city.  The population density was 2,255.7 people/sq mi (870.8/km).  The 12,503 housing units averaged 806.3/sq mi (311.2/km).  The racial makeup of the city was 74.66% White, 3.30% African American, 0.69% Native American, 9.39% Asian, 0.21% Pacific Islander, 7.34% from other races, and 4.39% from two or more races.  About 23.34% of the population were Hispanics or Latinos of any race.

Of the 12,163 households,  35.5% had children under  18 living with them, 57.7% were married couples living together, 11.6% had a female householder with no husband present, and 26.1% were not families. About 21.0% of all households were made up of individuals, and 8.7% had someone living alone who was 65 or older.  The average household size was 2.78, and the average family size was 3.23.

In the city, the age distribution was 25.5% under 18, 8.9% from 18 to 24, 28.1% from 25 to 44, 25.5% from 45 to 64, and 11.9% who were 65 or older.  The median age was 37 years.  For every 100 females, there were 92.2 males.  For every 100 females age 18 and over, there were 87.2 males.

The median income for a household in the city was $62,885, and for a family was $72,124. Males had a median income of $53,009 versus $36,057 for females. The per capita income for the city was $28,321.  6.3% of the population and 3.6% of families were below the poverty line.  Of the total population, 5.9% of those under the age of 18 and 11.5% of those 65 and older were living below the poverty line.

Local features

Attractions 
 Raging Waters Los Angeles, one of California's largest water parks
 The Pacific Railroad Museum, a museum and library in the former ATSF San Dimas Depot on Bonita Ave., operated by the Pacific Railroad Society
 Frank G. Bonelli Regional Park
 San Dimas Dog Park

Businesses 
 Headquarters of Magellan Navigation, a pioneer in the global positioning system industry
 Headquarters of Curative, a healthcare startup known for its scalable COVID-19 testing and COVID-19 vaccinations during the COVID-19 pandemic

Government

Education
The majority of the city lies within the Bonita Unified School District and students attend San Dimas High School.  Students living in the Via Verde neighborhood south of Puente Ave and along San Dimas Ave. attend South Hills High School in the Covina-Valley Unified School District.  Small numbers of students attend school in Charter Oak Unified School District. The city is also home to Life Pacific College, which is affiliated with the International Church of the Foursquare Gospel, offering undergraduate and graduate degrees.

Infrastructure

Transportation
A future extension of the Metro L Line, from its current terminus in Azusa to the City of Montclair in San Bernardino County, will include a station in downtown San Dimas. The station is not expected to be in service until 2026. When it opens, the rail line will be renamed the A Line per Metro's new naming convention, and it will connect with the former Blue Line via the new Regional Connector in downtown Los Angeles.

Law enforcement
The Los Angeles County Sheriff's Department provides law enforcement services for the city of San Dimas, and operates the San Dimas Station.

Fire department
The Los Angeles County Fire Department provides fire protection services for the city of San Dimas.

Health care
The Los Angeles County Department of Health Services operates the Pomona Health Center in Pomona, serving most of San Dimas. Some portions of San Dimas are served by the Monrovia Health Center in Monrovia.

Notable people

The following individuals are either notable current or former residents of San Dimas (R), were born or raised in San Dimas in their early years (B), or otherwise have a significant connection to the history of the San Dimas area (C).
 Ewell Blackwell, baseball player, Cincinnati Reds (B)
 Shannan Click, fashion model (B)
 Jamie Dantzscher, gymnast in the 2000 Olympics in Sydney for the U.S. Olympic Team (B)
 Bill Dwyre, columnist for Los Angeles Times (R)
 D.J. Hackett, wide receiver most recently with the Carolina Panthers (B)
 Christian Jimenez, soccer player, Real Salt Lake of Major League Soccer (B)
 Ian Johnson, football player, Detroit Lions (B)
Derek Klena, actor best known for Anastasia, Dogfight, and Jagged Little Pill (B)
 Peter Lambert, baseball player, Colorado Rockies (B)
 Lela Lee,  actress and comic book writer (B)
Alex Morgan, USA Women's Soccer Team (B)
 Wayne Moses, football coach for the St. Louis Rams, USC, UCLA, Washington, Stanford, Pitt, San Diego State and New Mexico (B)
 Bre Payton, writer for The Federalist (B)
 Chris Pettit, baseball player, Los Angeles Dodgers (B)
 P. J. Pilittere, Major League Baseball coach (B)
 Brett Pill, Major League Baseball player, San Francisco Giants (B)
 Jeremy Reed, baseball player, New York Mets (B)
 J. J. Spaun, professional golfer (B)
 Horace Jeremiah "Jerry" Voorhis, U.S. Representative and founder of Voorhis School for Boys (C)
 Adam Wylie, actor best known for television series Picket Fences (B)

See also

 San Dimas Hotel

References

External links

San Dimas Chamber of Commerce

 
Cities in Los Angeles County, California
Pomona Valley
Incorporated cities and towns in California
Populated places established in 1960
1960 establishments in California